Senator Coghill may refer to:

Jack Coghill (1925–2019), Alaska State Senate
John Coghill (born 1950), Alaska State Senate